The Archives of the History of American Psychology (AHAP) is a large collection of historical papers, instruments, films, photographs, and artifacts located at the University of Akron, in Akron, Ohio.

History
The Archives of the History of American Psychology was established in 1965 at the University of Akron.  Since the beginning, its main focus has been the collection of manuscripts which includes papers from over 740 psychologists.

The Archives have been expanding continuously since then, with the establishment in 1976 of the Child Development Film Archives. In 1980, numerous gifts of books were added to the collection, and they include published literature dealing with the "substantive content of psychology as well as with its history and philosophy." The Archives of the History of American Psychology is a subject-matter archives.

Collection
The collection contains over 740 individual collections, 50 records from organizations, 1,000 instruments and apparatuses, 6,000 film records, 15,000 images, 6,000 three-dimensional as well as paper and pencil tests, and 50,000 volumes including rare books, textbooks, professional and trade publications.

Notable items
Contained in the collection are many well-known artifacts of psychology.  These include:
Gowns from Philip Zimbardo's Stanford prison experiment
The shock box from Stanley Milgram's experiments on obedience
The inflatable doll from Albert Bandura's Bobo doll experiment

New facility
A wall-breaking ceremony was held on February 26, 2010 in order to mark the beginning of the renovation of the old Roadway Express records building, which was built in 1916. AHAP's prior home in the basement of the Polsky building, which provided only  of storage space and lacked a prominent location, helped fuel the decision for the facility to re-locate.

Current funding allowed for the renovation of the first floor of four-story facility, with the other areas of the building being completed as more funds are secured. The first floor houses the gallery, the reading room, office space, and some collections.

See also
 Milgram experiment
 Stanford prison experiment
 History of psychology
 List of psychology organizations
 University of Akron

References

External links
Official Website of The Center for the History Psychology
Official Website of The Archives of the History of American Psychology
Department of Psychology at the University of Akron

University of Akron
History of psychology
Archives in the United States